Delphine Horvilleur (born 8 November 1974) is France's third female rabbi, and (as of 2012) editorial director of the quarterly Jewish magazine Revue de pensée(s) juive(s) Tenou'a. She leads a congregation in Paris, and is currently co-leading the Liberal Jewish Movement of France, a Jewish liberal cultural and religious association affiliated to the World Union for Progressive Judaism, which she joined in 2008. In 2013 her book En tenue d’Eve. Féminin, Pudeur et Judaïsme (In a Birthday Suit: Feminism, Modesty and Judaism), which discusses the representation of nudity and modesty in the Bible, was published.

Life
Horvilleur was born and raised in Nancy, but moved to Jerusalem at the age of 17 and studied life sciences at the Hebrew University. Five years later, she came back to Paris and worked as a journalist. She studied with well-known Jewish scholars, such as French philosopher Marc-Alain Ouaknin and ex-Chief Rabbi Gilles Bernheim, and eventually moved to New York and studied at Drisha Yeshiva. She was ordained at the Hebrew Union College-Jewish Institute of Religion in New York in 2008, and later returned to France. In 2016, Najat Vallaud-Belkacem awarded her a special commendation.

In 2009, Horvilleur became editor-in-chief of Tenou'a a quarterly journal  published by the Tenou'a association from the Liberal Jewish Movement of France. It makes it a reference magazine of liberal Jewish thought in France, where various religious sensibilities are found around societal issues (feminism, environment, sexuality, migration policy, etc.).

In 2020, during the COVID-19 pandemic, Horvilleur became known for her weekly online Zoom talks on Jewish texts. Her popular lectures were attended by a variety people outside of the Jewish community.

Horvilleur is married to Ariel Weil, mayor of the Paris Centre arrondissement. They have three children.

Publications
 
 
 
 
  with Rachid Benzine, 
 in English released as

References

External links 
 Tenou’a magazine

1974 births
Living people
French Reform rabbis
Reform women rabbis
French expatriates in Israel
21st-century French rabbis
French people of Israeli descent
Writers from Nancy, France
Writers from Paris
Officiers of the Ordre des Arts et des Lettres
Knights of the Ordre national du Mérite
Clergy from Nancy, France